Sakalis is a Greek surname (Σακαλής). Notable people with the surname include:

Sofia Sakalis, Australian soccer player  
 Roni Sakalis, alias of Rony Seikaly,  Lebanese-American basketball player, while he was playing in Greece
 Dimitra Sakalis, Greek screenwriter, e.g., of Mavra Mesanychta
Georgios Sakalis, Minister of State (Greece) in exile (1944)

Greek-language surnames